Artem Voronov (born March 26, 1993) is an alpine skier from Uzbekistan. He will compete for Uzbekistan at the 2014 Winter Olympics in the slalom and giant slalom.

References 

1993 births
Living people
Uzbekistani male alpine skiers
Olympic alpine skiers of Uzbekistan
Alpine skiers at the 2014 Winter Olympics
Sportspeople from Tashkent
Alpine skiers at the 2011 Asian Winter Games
21st-century Uzbekistani people